Andrew Kenny is the main singer/songwriter of The Wooden Birds, which released their debut LP Magnolia in May 2009. Their second album, Two Matchsticks, was released June 2011. He was the frontman for the American indie/lo-fi band The American Analog Set.  In 2003, he released a split EP in the Home Series (Vol. V) with Benjamin Gibbard. In 2005, he contributed towards Broken Social Scene's 2005 self-titled album. Andrew Kenny toured briefly with Broken Social Scene in 2007 and with Ola Podrida in 2008 before moving back home to Austin to work on his own recordings.

In 2008, Kenny wrote and performed the entire score for the short film Pickup and Return, which was written and directed by award-winning writer/director Alex R. Johnson. In 2014, Kenny scored another Johnson film, Two Step, which premiered that year at the SXSW Film Festival.

Discography

Solo
Home Volume V with Ben Gibbard (2003)

The American Analog Set
 The Fun of Watching Fireworks (1996)
 From Our Living Room to Yours (1997)
 The Golden Band (1999)
 Know by Heart (2001)
 Promise of Love (2003)
 Set Free (2005)

The Wooden Birds
Magnolia (2009)
Montague Street EP (2010)
Two Matchsticks (2011)

References

American male singers
American male songwriters
Living people
Year of birth missing (living people)